The 2020 Route d'Occitanie was a men's road bicycle race which took place from 1 to 4 August 2020 in France. It was the 44th edition of the Route d'Occitanie. The race was rated as a 2.1 event and formed part of the 2020 UCI Europe Tour.

Teams
Twenty-one teams participated in the race. The teams that participated were:

UCI WorldTeams

 
 
 
 
 
 
 
 

UCI Professional Continental Teams

 
 
 
 
 
 
 
 
 

UCI Continental Teams

Route

Stages

Stage 1
1 August 2020 – Saint-Affrique to Cazouls-lès-Béziers,

Stage 2
2 August 2020 – Carcassonne to Cap Découverte,

Stage 3
3 August 2020 – Saint-Gaudens to Col de Beyrède,

Stage 4
4 August 2020 – Lectoure to Rocamadour,

Classification leadership

 On stage two, Elia Viviani, who was second in the points classification, wore the green jersey, because first placed Bryan Coquard wore the orange jersey as leader of the general classification.
 On stage two, Egan Bernal, who was second in the young rider classification, wore the white jersey, because first placed Andreas Kron wore the blue polkadot jersey as leader of the mountains classification.
 On stages three and four, Pavel Sivakov, who was second in the young rider classification, wore the white jersey, because first placed Egan Bernal wore the orange jersey as leader of the general classification.

Final classification standings

General classification

Points classification

Mountains classification

Young rider classification

Teams classification

References

2020 UCI Europe Tour
2020 in French sport
August 2020 sports events in France